"Genau hier" (English: "Right Here") is a song by German singer Sarah Lombardi. It was written by Florian Cojocaru and Elżbieta Steinmetz for her third studio album Zurück zu mir (2018), while production was helmed by Hermann Niesig. The song was released on 13 April 2018 by El Cartel Music and the Universal Music Group as the album's lead single.

Track listing
Digital download
"Genau hier" – 3:16

Charts

References

2018 singles
Sarah Lombardi songs
2018 songs